Isosceles Peak is a  mountain summit located in British Columbia, Canada.

Description
Isosceles Peak is set within Garibaldi Provincial Park and is part of the Garibaldi Ranges of the Coast Mountains. Precipitation runoff and glacial meltwater from the south side of the peak drains into headwaters of Pitt River, and the northern slope drains to Cheakamus Lake via Isosceles Creek. Topographic relief is significant as the summit rises 1,700 meters (5,577 feet) above Pitt River in 4 kilometers (2.5 miles).

History

The first ascent of Isosceles Peak was made in August 1922 by Don Munday, his wife Phyllis Munday, Neal Carter, Harold O'Connor, and Clausen Thompson.

The peak's descriptive name refers to its shape similar to an isosceles triangle. The toponym was officially adopted September 2, 1930, by the Geographical Names Board of Canada.

Climate

Based on the Köppen climate classification, Isosceles Peak is located in the marine west coast climate zone of western North America. Most weather fronts originate in the Pacific Ocean, and travel east toward the Coast Mountains where they are forced upward by the range (Orographic lift), causing them to drop their moisture in the form of rain or snowfall. As a result, the Coast Mountains experience high precipitation, especially during the winter months in the form of snowfall. Winter temperatures can drop below −20 °C with wind chill factors below −30 °C. This climate supports the Isosceles Glacier on the northeast slope and unnamed glaciers surrounding the peak.

See also
 
 Geography of British Columbia

References

External links
 Isosceles Peak: Weather forecast

Garibaldi Ranges
Two-thousanders of British Columbia
Sea-to-Sky Corridor
New Westminster Land District
Coast Mountains